Sigulda Castle also known as Sigulda New Castle. Built in 1878 in the Neo-Gothic style as the living house for the owners of the manor, the Kropotkin family. The building has changed its owners and functions several times. Since 1993, the Sigulda Region Council has been located in the castle.

History
The manor center began to develop in the fore-castle area of Sigulda Medieval Castle during the 17th century. There are still a few remaining 18th and 19th century buildings built during the ownership of the Von Borghs and Kropotkins. These are the Summer Castle, the New Castle, the White Castle, the vagar's (supervisor of serfs) house, the servants' house, a barn, a laundry house and a vegetable and fruit basement. The manor center is enclosed by chipped boulder walls with a splendid gate structure.

The New Castle was built during the time of Duchess Olga and Duke Dimitry Kropotkins from 1878 until 1881 using the materials from an older building which stood here during the 17th century.

The master’s house was built in neo-gothic style by Jānis Mengelis from Cēsis. The planning and the shape of the house is simple. The architectural and artistic value of the castle is achieved through the successful use of Gothic forms and the color shades from the recycled chipped boulders. Looking through any window, you will have a panoramic view of the Gauja valley including the ruins of Sigulda castle. Farther away you will see the ruins of Krimulda and Turaida. On the opposite side, there is a neatly landscaped yard.

During World War I this building was destroyed. In 1922, following the agrarian reforms, New Castle became the Writers’ Castle because it was used by the Latvian Union of Writers and Journalists. The building was in unusable condition after the war so the Union had to invest a large amount of money for restoration. In the 1920s and 1930s, full room and board was offered to writers and literary types as well as other visitors.

In 1934 the castle was acquired by the Latvian Press Society. From 1936 to 1937, major reconstruction work was done under the leadership of architect August Birkhans. Building plans were completely re-drawn. The overlooking tower was heightened, the terrace around the building was expanded and a new balcony was added to the second floor. Inside, a new modern-age interior design was installed. It became the most notable example of national modern design in the Baltic region. Many famous artists of that time such as Niklāvs Strunke, Pēteris Ozoliņš, Kārlis Sūniņš, and Vilhelms Vasariņš took part in creating it. Pictures of the castle were found in French art magazines as the press at the time would report. The Writers Castle became a popular visitor's destination after the renovation.

In 1938, the monument of Atis Kronvalds, made by Teodors Zalkalns, was unveiled at the front of the New Castle. Atis Kronvalds was a teacher and a publicist and helped initiate the second wave of the New Latvian movement.

During World War II, the New Castle was used as a headquarters for the Nord division of the German army. After the war, the USSR Council of Ministers made it a recreation house for high state officials. In 1953, the Health Department of the Latvian SSR established the Sigulda rehabilitation center which was in operation until the restoration of Latvian independence.

From 1993 through 2002, the New Castle held the Sigulda City council and then, beginning in 2003, the Sigulda District Council.

Next to the New Castle, there is a yellow house known as the Summer Castle. It was built at the turn of the 18th or 19th century in the style of classicism. The elongated wooden house was built by a master-builder from Cēsis, a man called the last of the Livs of Vidzeme, Mārcis Sārums. Initially, Kropotkin's family used the building as a personal orthodox church after the completion of the New Castle in 1881. Services were held by the orthodox priest of Ledurga parish. The building also came under reconstruction when the Writers and Journalists Union obtained ownership and remodelled it to become a boarding-house.

An art gallery was installed in the former brewery of Sigulda manor.

Gallery

See also
 Turaida Castle
 Krimulda Castle
 Sigulda Medieval Castle

References

External links

Sigulda
Castles in Latvia
Manor houses in Latvia